Synesthesia is a studio album from Canadian pop punk band Courage My Love. It was released on February 3, 2017.

Synesthesia is Courage My Love's second full-length album, the first being a re-release of a previous EP. The album combines the pop punk sound the band is known for, plus elements of synthwave and synthpop. The album was influenced by drummer Phoenix Arn-Horn teaching herself synth programming.

Background 
"Synesthesia is very much new age, with a mix of pop, punk, indie and dance" says Jared Allen of Volume Magazine.

"These songs are all composed well." said NewNoise. "They’re broad and diverse, creeping up on the necks of bands similar in style. But, this trio doesn’t want to be pigeonholed, they want to hit the ground running with their guts intact and the music pulsating in those veins. All the tracks on Synesthesia are expertly driven."

She Shreds Magazine interviewed the band when the single "Stereo" was released. The interview states that, "Songwriting was done in two phases. The first lasted nearly two years before an initial recording session and the remainder of the album was developed from there. “We knew going in that we didn’t want to rush anything (as much as we all wanted new music out ASAP),” Mercedes says. “We knew that at this stage in our career this album was pretty much make or break. This would be the turning point. So we couldn’t allow any filler songs. That’s why the last five songs, especially, had to be above and beyond anything we’d done before. There was a lot of pressure, but sometimes pressure can lead to an amazing end result.”

In an interview with AltPress, lead singer Mercedes Arn-Horn describes the album as "a story everyone can relate to. A heartbreak, a crisis of faith, and also the long struggle toward regaining your self-esteem and self-respect. We chose the title Synesthesia because we thought it was the perfect concept for trying to describing the feeling of being lost and overwhelmed by emotions."

Track listing

Music videos 

 Stereo
 Need Someone
 Animal Heart
 Walls

Personnel 

 Mercedes Arn-Horn - Vocals, guitars
 Phoenix Arn-Horn - Drums, vocals, synths 
 Brandon Lockwood - Bass

References 

2017 albums
Courage My Love albums
Warner Records albums